The Urey Medal is given annually by the European Association of Geochemistry for outstanding contributions advancing Geochemistry over a career.  The award is named after the physical chemist Harold Urey, FRS.

Urey Medalists

See also

 List of geology awards

References

European science and technology awards
Geology awards